Komety is one of Poland's most popular and distinctive alternative groups. Its line-up: Lesław (voice, guitar, music, words), W. Szewko (bass, voice) and Arkus (drums, voice). The group has created a characteristic musical/lyrical style all their own. Before Komety, Lesław had been the leader of the now defunct group Partia.

In 2003, Komety released their début album on Jimmy Jazz Records.

In 2005, the Via Ardiente album was released and they played at the punk rock festival Antifest in the Czech Republic. Komety 2004-2006, featuring previously unreleased material, came out the following year. The next album, Akcja v1 came out in 2007. Singles taken from that album topped many Polish charts.

In early 2008, Mexico's Esquilo Records released The Story of Komety a collection of the group's best-known selections. In March 2009, Zloto Aztekow, a live album also featuring new studio recordings, came out on Jimmy Jazz Records.

Komety are one of the few Polish groups to have gained popularity abroad. Their songs have appeared on compilation albums in such countries as the US, France, Finland, Germany, Japan, and Russia.

Their album Luminal came out in April 2011. Their album Paso Fino was released in 2014 by Thin Man Records, and their newest album Bal nadziei was released in 2016, also by Thin Man Records.

On April 3, 2022, Komety supported by  Trojka performed a concert for their 20th anniversary.

Members
Lesław - vocals, guitar, song-writing
W.Szewko - bass guitar
Arkus - drums

Discography
 2003 - Komety
 2005 - Via Ardiente
 2006 - Via Ardiente - English version
 2006 - Komety 2004-2006
 2007 - Akcja v1
 2008 - Akcja v1 - English version
 2008 - The Story of Komety
 2011 - Luminal
 2014 - Paso Fino
 2016 - Bal nadziel

External links
Komety Official Site
Komety - myspace

Polish musical groups